Heppner may refer to:

 Heppner (surname)
 Heppner, Oregon
 Heppner, South Dakota
 Heppner National Forest, in northeast Oregon

See also
 Oregon Route 74,  Heppner Highway No. 52
 Oregon Route 206, a.k.a. Wasco-Heppner Highway No. 300
 Oregon Route 207, containing the Heppner-Spray Highway No. 321